Yên Thủy is a rural district of Hòa Bình province in the Northwest region of Vietnam. As of 2003, the district had a population of 62,050. The district covers an area of 282 km². The district capital is Hàng Trạm.

References

Districts of Hòa Bình province
Hòa Bình province